The 2022 NYJTL Bronx Open was a professional tennis tournament played on outdoor hard courts. It was the nineteenth edition of the tournament which was part of the 2022 ITF Women's World Tennis Tour. It took place in The Bronx, United States between 15 and 21 August 2022.

Champions

Singles

  Kamilla Rakhimova def.  Mirjam Björklund, 6–2, 6–3

Doubles

  Anna Blinkova /  Simona Waltert def.  Han Na-lae /  Hiroko Kuwata, 6–3, 6–3

Singles main draw entrants

Seeds

 1 Rankings are as of 8 August 2022.

Other entrants
The following players received wildcards into the singles main draw:
  Louisa Chirico
  Ashlyn Krueger
  Jamie Loeb
  Sachia Vickery

The following players received entry from the qualifying draw:
  Kateryna Baindl
  Kimberly Birrell
  Anna Blinkova
  Fernanda Contreras Gómez
  Anastasia Gasanova
  Lesley Pattinama Kerkhove
  Oksana Selekhmeteva
  Yuan Yue

References

External links
 2022 Bronx Open at ITFtennis.com
 Official website

Bronx Open
2022 ITF Women's World Tennis Tour
2022 in American tennis
August 2022 sports events in the United States
2022 in sports in New York City